Borjak-e Sheykhi (also Romanized as Borjak-e Sheykhī) is a village in Jannatabad Rural District, Salehabad County, Razavi Khorasan Province, Iran. At the 2006 census, its population was 346, in 65 families.

References 

Populated places in   Torbat-e Jam County